Edmund Tudor  may refer to:
 Edmund Tudor, 1st Earl of Richmond, father of Henry VII
Edmund Tudor, Duke of Somerset, son of Henry VII